Stefi Baum (born December 11, 1958 in Chicago, Illinois) is an American astronomer. The American Astronomical Society honored her work by awarding her the Annie J. Cannon Prize in 1993. Baum helped to develop the Hubble Space Telescope and, starting in 2004, was the director of Rochester Institute of Technology’s Chester F. Carlson Center for Imaging Science.

Early life
Baum was born in Chicago, Illinois, on December 11, 1958. She is the daughter of mathematician Leonard Baum. She attended Princeton Public High School in Princeton, New Jersey, and graduated in 1976. Baum received her Bachelor of Arts in physics from Harvard University and graduated with distinction, and a PhD in astronomy from the University of Maryland. She is currently the dean of the Faculty of Science and professor of physics and astronomy at the University of Manitoba.

Career 
Baum is the dean of the faculty of science at the University of Manitoba and is a professor of physics and astronomy. Prior to this, Baum accepted the Cashin Fellowship at the Radcliffe Institute for Advanced Study from September 2011, to July 2012. In 2002 Baum became the Senior Science/Diplomacy Fellow at the US department of state and the American Institute of Physics Diplomacy Fellow program, leaving the position in 2004. Baum served as division head for engineering and software services at the STScl from 1999 to 2002. During her period there she also held the position of deputy, science and engineering support division in 1999. From 1996 to 1998, Baum was the Branch Chief, Spectrographs Team, STScl. From 1991 to 1995 Baum, was an archive scientist at STScl. In 1990 to 1991 Baum had a fellowship at Johns Hopkins University. From 1987 to 1990 Baum conducted research in Astronomy at the Netherlands' Foundation for Research in Astronomy, Dwingeloo, NL.

Awards 
Baum has won many awards throughout her career, including: 
 1993: Annie Jump Cannon Award awarded annually to a young female astronomer for Scientific Excellence and Promise 
 1993: Space Telescope Science Institute Group Achievement Award, Archive Development/Deployment 
 1993: Space Telescope Science Institute Individual Achievement Award, Archive Development/Deployment
 1996: Space Telescope Science Institute Group Achievement Award, Data Quality Project 
 1996:  Space Telescope Science Institute Individual Achievement Award, Space Telescope Imaging Spectrograph
 1996: Space Telescope Science Institute Group Achievement Award, Space Telescope Imaging Spectrograph Team
 1999: NASA Excellence Award, Hubble Space Telescope Servicing Mission 3A  
 1999: Rolex Achievement Award- given annually to one female and one male college lacrosse player for career achievements supporting society.  
 2002: Space Telescope Science Institute Individual Achievement Award, for Management and Leadership
 2002/2003:  American Institute of Physics - US State Department Fellowship 
 2005: Rochester Institute of Technology Million Dollar Club- for securing more than 1 Million dollars in external grants and contracts
 2020: Elected a Legacy Fellow of the American Astronomical Society

References

1958 births
Living people
American women astronomers
21st-century Canadian astronomers
Academic staff of the University of Manitoba
Harvard College alumni
University of Maryland, College Park alumni
Recipients of the Annie J. Cannon Award in Astronomy
Fellows of the American Astronomical Society
20th-century American astronomers